Brigadier General Frederick William Lumsden,  (14 December 1872 – 4 June 1918) was a British officer in Royal Marine Artillery and during the First World War. During his service he was decorated four times for valorous service and saw action in several major campaigns before he was killed just months before the war's end in June 1918. Amongst his decorations was the Victoria Cross, the highest award for gallantry to British or Commonwealth troops. He was also the first of seven British officers to be awarded the DSO four times in the First World War.

Early life
Frederick William Lumsden was born into a military family in Faizabad, India on 14 December 1872. His father, James Foot Lumsden, worked in the Indian Civil Service. At a young age he returned to Britain and attended Bristol Grammar School.

Lumsden married Mary, the daughter of Lieutenant General Thomas N. Harward of the Royal Artillery, in December 1894. They had one daughter, Violet.

Military career
Lumsden joined the Royal Marine Artillery as a junior officer in 1890. He served in the Marine Service until 1907, spending time in the Mediterranean and four years on Ascension Island. He entered the Staff College, qualifying in 1908. He then became the second staff officer at Singapore, and was promoted to the rank of major in 1913.  He returned home for war service in the months leading up to the outbreak of hostilities in August 1914.  He served in France with the Royal Marine howitzer brigade in France until 1915 and was then seconded to serve in staff appointments with the British Army. In late 1915 he was attached to the Intelligence Department of First Army Headquarters. He was promoted to the rank of temporary brigadier general to command the 14th Infantry Brigade in April 1917.

Awards and decorations
On 1 January 1917, Major Lumsden was awarded his first Distinguished Service Order "for distinguished service in the field". The first and second Bars to his DSO were gazetted together in May 1917, and he was the first person to receive a third Bar in April 1918.

On 8 June 1917, the awarding of the Victoria Cross to Major Lumsden was approved. This was for actions that took place between 3 and 4 April 1917 in Francilly, France. The citation in the London Gazette reads as follows:

He was appointed as a Companion of the Order of the Bath on 3 June 1918, just a few days before his death. He was also mentioned in despatches on four occasions, and awarded the Belgian Croix de guerre.

Death and remembrance
Lumsden was killed in action in his 46th year at Blairville, near the city of Arras, France, on 4 June 1918: he was shot through the head and died instantly. His body was buried in the Berles New Military Cemetery, Berles-au-Bois, France.

In 1920 the Mess of the Royal Marines commissioned H. Donald Smith to paint two portraits of Lumsden. The work is now housed in the Royal Marines Museum in the Royal Marine Artillery Barracks, Southsea, Portsmouth. His Victoria Cross is also displayed at the museum.

References

1872 births
1918 deaths
People educated at Bristol Grammar School
Royal Marines generals
Royal Marines generals of World War I
British World War I recipients of the Victoria Cross
British military personnel killed in World War I
Recipients of the Croix de guerre (Belgium)
Royal Navy recipients of the Victoria Cross
Companions of the Distinguished Service Order
Graduates of the Staff College, Camberley
Military personnel of British India